Justice Melvin may refer to:

Henry A. Melvin, associate justice of the Supreme Court of California
Joan Orie Melvin, associate justice of the Pennsylvania Supreme Court
Ridgely P. Melvin, associate justice of the Maryland Court of Appeals